Chryseofusus cadus is a species of sea snail, a marine gastropod mollusk in the family Fasciolariidae, the spindle snails, the tulip snails and their allies.

Description
The length of the shell attains 35.7 mm.

Distribution
This marine species occurs of New Caledonia.

References

 Hadorn R. & Fraussen K. (2003) The deep-water Indo-Pacific radiation of Fusinus (Chryseofusus subgen. nov.) (Gastropoda: Fasciolariidae). Iberus 21(1): 207-240

Fasciolariidae
Gastropods described in 2003